Teschke is a surname. Notable people with the surname include:

 Benno Teschke (born 1967), German international relations theorist
 Jana Teschke (born 1990), German field hockey player